Casimiro Biguá was a 19th century Tehuelche cacique in Patagonia. He opposed the Chilean colonization of the Strait of Magellan and in the 1860s he entered an alliance with Argentine authorities. In a bid to establish Argentine sovereignty over the strait Argentine "ad-hoc agent" Luis Piedra Buena brought Biguá to Buenos Aires where met President Bartolomé Mitre and was declared lieutenant colonel of the Argentine Army and granted a salary accordingly. In 1866 he signed a treaty with Argentine authorities where the Tehuelche were recognized as Argentine citizens and Argentine sovereignty up to the strait of Magellan was declared. The influence of Casimiro Biguá in political affairs declined in the late 1860s. 

He was known for his deference to English travellers and sea-farers.

References

Sources 
 

Argentine Army personnel
Tehuelche people
Indigenous leaders of the Americas
Year of birth uncertain